Pangalengan is a district (Kecamatan) in the Bandung Regency, Indonesia.

Main industries of the Pangalengan district include dairy farming and tourism, the latter arising from the popularity of the many traditional villages and natural attractions such as lakes, ponds, hot springs and waterfalls in the district. The area is an important centre of activity for the tea industry in Indonesia. There is also considerable interest in the potential for the use of geothermal sites in the region for the production of electricity. The Wayang Windu plant, the largest geothermal plant in Indonesia with a capacity of 227 megawatts, is located to the east of Pangalengan on the slopes of the Wayang Windu volcano.  The site has been jointly developed by Star Energy and PT Pertamina Geothermal Energy, a subsidiary of the large state-owned oil company Pertamina. The activity has not been without controversy however and local people near the site have sometimes protested about certain aspects of the development.

Pangalengan became a major site for the placement of refugees (internally displaced persons, or IDPs) after the large West Java earthquake in September 2009. Following the earthquake, it was estimated that 50,000 homes had been destroyed in the area, 80,000 people had been left homeless, and around 250,000 people had been displaced.

Administrative divisions
Pangalengan is divided into 13 following villages

Nature reserves
 Malabar
 Mount Tilu (shared with Pasirjambu)

Mountains and volcanoes
 Malabar Mountain (Besar peak is located entirely within Pangalengan, Haruman peak is shared with Cimaung) and several peaks and hills around it
 Mount Bedil
 Wayang Volcano (shared with Kertasari)
 Windu Volcano
 Mount Kencana
 Mount Riung Gunung
 Mount Waringin (shared with Pasirjambu)
 Mount Tilu

Tourism
A shortage of good roads in the area is believed to have held back development.  However, the area is attractive and was formerly well known for tourist spots in the Malabar region.

Some of the tea estates in the area provide good facilities for tourists to stay overnight, walk through tracks in the tea plantations, and bath in nearby hot springs.

Main tourism sites near Pangalengan include the following.
 Cultural or historical sites such as the Cikondang traditional village, and the gravesite of the Dutchman K.A.R. Bosscha who played a key role in helping develop the tea industry in the area.
 Tea and quinine estates such as the Malabar estate and estates at Kertamanah, Purbasari, Pasir Junghuhn, Pasirmalang, Cukul, and the Indonesian Research Institute for Tea and Quinine  at Gambang.
 Various lakes, of which the most well-known is Lake Cileunca, along with Lake Cipanunjang
 Small lakes like Gede, Datar, Cukul, Cicoledas, and Kanceuh
 Numerous hot springs
 Waterfalls such as Panganten, Malabar, Patra, Sanghiang, and Bangku Waterfall
 Wayang-Windu bike park
 Cukul sunrise point

References 

Bandung Regency
Populated places in West Java